Colombiana de Televisión (shortened as Coltevisión or CTV) is a Colombian programadora for Canal Uno and Caracol Television. It is one of the few Canal Uno programadoras remaining. Some of its most popular shows are Padres e Hijos and Sweet, el dulce sabor del chisme. It was founded by Francisco de Zubiría Gómez on June 16, 1972.

External links 
  Official webpage

Television production companies of Colombia
1972 establishments in Colombia]
Mass media companies established in 1972